Kintore Caves Conservation Reserve is a protected area in the Northern Territory of Australia.

The area is made up of karst limestone and has an extensive network of caves that contain rare fauna and evidence of a long history of human occupation. The conservation reserve shares a boundary to the north with the Northern Territory Rural College and to the south with private property zoned for rural use.

See also
Protected areas of the Northern Territory

References

Conservation reserves in the Northern Territory